Chao Inthasom (died 1749) was the king of Luang Phrabang from 1723 to 1749.

Inthasom was a younger brother of Kingkitsarat. Upon his brother's death in 1713, he marched to Luang Phrabang aiming to challenge the throne, but his cousin Ong Kham crowned the new king and granted him the title oupahat (viceroy).

After ten years of joint rule, Inthasom successfully usurped in the king's absence. He dispatched tribute missions to China in 1723, 1734 and 1753. He ruled peacefully until his death in 1749.

References

Kings of Luang Phrabang
1749 deaths
18th-century Laotian people